Gaule Bjerg is a mountain in King Christian IX Land, Sermersooq Municipality, Greenland. 
 
There is little information about this mountain.

Geography
Gaule Bjerg is an isolated nunatak located north of the Fenris Glacier, west of the northern end of the Schweizerland Range. This mountain is marked as a  peak in the Defense Mapping Agency Greenland Navigation charts.

See also
List of nunataks of Greenland

References

External links
Gaule Bjerg - Peakery

Gaule
Gaule